The 1914 Ice Hockey European Championship was the fifth edition of the ice hockey tournament for European countries associated to the International Ice Hockey Federation .  
 
The tournament was played between February 25, and February 27, 1914, in Berlin, Germany, and it was won by Bohemia.

Results

February 25

February 26

February 27

Final standings

Top Goalscorer

Jaroslav Jirkovský (Bohemia), 7 goals

References
 Euro Championship 1914

     
1914
Ice Hockey European Championships
Sports competitions in Berlin
1910s in Berlin
Ice Hockey European Championship